Albert Amrakhovich Gadzhibekov (born 17 February 1988) is a Russian former professional football player of Lezgin descent.

Career

Club
He made his Russian Football National League debut for FC Anzhi Makhachkala on 8 April 2006 in a game against FC Dynamo Makhachkala. He played 7 seasons in the FNL.

On 5 February 2019, Gadzhibekov joined FC Banants on loan until the end of the 2018–19 season.

Personal life
He is the older brother of Ali Gadzhibekov.

External links

References

1988 births
Footballers from Makhachkala
Living people
Russian footballers
Association football midfielders
FC Anzhi Makhachkala players
FC Dynamo Stavropol players
FC Metallurg Lipetsk players
FC Luch Vladivostok players
FC Dynamo Saint Petersburg players
FC Armavir players
FC Urartu players
Russian expatriate footballers
Expatriate footballers in Armenia